Free – Live at the BBC is a live album by the English rock band Free. It was recorded between 1968 and 1971 on BBC on various occasions both "in session" and "in concert". It was released in 2006 by Island Records.

Track listing

All tracks written by Andy Fraser & Paul Rodgers unless otherwise noted.

Personnel
 Paul Rodgers – vocals, piano
 Paul Kossoff – lead guitar
 Andy Fraser – bass guitar, backing vocals
 Simon Kirke – drums

References

External links 
 Free - Live at the BBC (2006) album review, credits & releases at AllMusic
 Free - Live at the BBC (2006) album releases & credits at Discogs
 Free - Live at the BBC (2006) album to be listened as stream on Spotify

Free (band) albums
2006 live albums